The Rangers Battalion is a Special operations force in the Special Operations Regiment of the Army of North Macedonia. It consists of the former Reconnaissance battalion and the Parachuting squad as well as servicemen from other units.

Awards 
In 2011 the President and the Supreme Commander of the armed forces awarded the Rangers Battalion the medal of military merits for a successful accomplishment of their tasks and challenges.

See also
  Special Forces Battalion
  Ceremonial Guard Battalion
  Military Reserve Force (Macedonia)
  North Macedonia Air Brigade
  Army of the Republic of North Macedonia
 Military Service for Security and Intelligence
  North Macedonia

References

Gallery

Military units and formations of North Macedonia
Military units and formations established in 2004